Coco Malia Camille Hapaikekoa Ho (born April 28, 1991) is a professional Hawaiian surfer born in Honolulu, Hawaii.  She began surfing at 7 years old, following in the footsteps of her family.

Early years
At age 7, Coco Ho began following in the footsteps of her surfer family.  Coco's father, Michael Ho, was a professional surfer (World Cup and 1982 Pipe Masters) as well as her uncle, Derek Ho (1993 World Champion).  Her brother, Mason Ho (1st Place Cold Water Classic ASP Pro Jr. 2008), played a major role in Coco's early surfing influences; he inspired her to surf as well as he did.  With her parents allowing her to discover the sport of surfing, and with brother Mason there to impress her, Coco was set for a life in the water.
Coco earned her first sponsorship at 8 years old and at age 17, she qualified for the ASP Women's World Championship Tour.  In 2009, Coco won the Rookie of the Year award. Raised on Oahu's North Shore, Coco spent most of her time surfing the "Seven Mile Miracle.” Coco is now the new face for Volcom Clothing and lifestyle brand.

Career victories

	2005 Open Women's Regional Hawaii Champion
	2006 Open Regional Hawaiian Champion
	2006 Hawaii Billabong Junior Champion
	2007 Sunset Beach WCT - Trials winner (quarter final finish)
	2007 VQS Championship - 1st place
	2007 Triple Crown Rookie of the Year
	2008 US Open Junior Pro Champion
	2009 Ripcurl Search Portugal Champion
	2009 ASP Rookie of the Year
	2010 Bahia Brazil, WQS 4 Star Champion
	2010 Supergirl Pro Junior 1st place
	2010 Maresia Girls International, (Brazil) WQS 6 Star -1st place
	2011 ASP Pro Junior Champion
	2011 Women's Legendary Pacific Coast Pro, (Newcastle, Australia) WQS 6 Star - Champion
	2011 World Qualifying Champion
	2013 ASP Heat Of The Year
       2014 Los Cabos Open Of Surf WQS 6 Star- Champion
       2014 Oceano Santa Catarina Pro WQS 6 Star - Champion
       2016 Supergirl Pro - Champion

Surfer Magazine: Top 5 most popular surfers’ Surfer Poll

	2010 - 3rd Place
	2011 – 2nd place
	2012 – 3rd Place
	2019 - 6th place

Filmography 

2002 Blue Crush, Young Anne Marie
2007 Heart of a Soul Surfer, Self
2010 Six Days In Paradise, Alicia McShane
2010 First Love, Self
2011 Leave A Message, Herself
2018 She Is The Ocean, Self
2020 Bethany Hamilton: Unstoppable, Self

References

Living people
1991 births
American female surfers
American surfers
Sportspeople from Honolulu
American sportspeople of Chinese descent
Native Hawaiian sportspeople
Hawaii people of Chinese descent
World Surf League surfers
21st-century American women